The Hellenic Winter Sports Federation (HWSF) replaced in 2014 the defunct Hellenic Ice Sports Federation (HISF) as the governing body of ice hockey in Greece.

2013 Greece participation

See also
Greece national ice hockey team
Greek Ice Hockey Championship

References

External links
IIHF profile
Ελληνική Ομοσπονδία Χειμερινών Αθλημάτων  
Ice hockey in Greece

1987 establishments in Greece
Bobsleigh in Greece
Figure skating in Greece
Ice hockey governing bodies in Europe
Ice hockey in Greece
International Ice Hockey Federation members
International Skating Union
Luge
Speed skating
Ice